Frank Wragge (born February 1898) was an English professional footballer who played as a centre-half for Wolverhampton Wanderers.

References

1898 births
Footballers from Wolverhampton
English footballers
Wolverhampton Wanderers F.C. players
Bristol Rovers F.C. players
Stafford Rangers F.C. players
Torquay United F.C. players
Walsall F.C. players
Year of death missing
Oakengates Athletic F.C. players
Association football defenders